Appropriation in sociology is, according to James J. Sosnoski, "the assimilation of concepts into a governing framework...[the] arrogation, confiscation, [or] seizure of concepts." According to Tracy B Strong it contains the Latin root proprius, which, "carries the connotations not only of property, but also of proper, stable, assured and indeed of common or ordinary." He elaborates: "I have appropriated something when I have made it mine, in a manner that I feel comfortable with, that is in a manner to which the challenges of others will carry little or no significance. A text, we might then say, is appropriated when its reader does not find himself or herself called into question by it, but does find him or herself associated with it. A text is successfully appropriated insofar as the appropriator no longer is troubled with it; it has become a part of his or her understanding, and it is recognized by others as 'owned,' not openly available for interpretation." 

Misappropriation according to Gloria Anzaldúa is "the difference between appropriation [(misappropriation)] and proliferation is that the first steals and harms; the second helps heal breaches of knowledge."

See also
Appropriation of knowledge
Appropriation (art)
Cultural appropriation
Grok
Reappropriation

Sources
Thomas, Calvin, ed. (2000). "Introduction: Identification, Appropriation, Proliferation", Straight with a Twist: Queer Theory and the Subject of Heterosexuality. University of Illinois Press. .
Sosnoski, James J. (1993). "A Mindless Man-Driven Theory Machine: Intellectuality, Sexuality, and the Institution of Criticism", Feminisms: An Anthology of Literary Theory and Criticism, p. 50. Eds. Robyn Warhol and Diane L. Herndl. New Brunswick, N.J.: Rutgers University Press.
Strong, Tracy B. (1996). "Nietzsche's Political Misappropriation", The Cambridge Companion to Nietzsche, p. 125. Eds. Bernd Magnus and Kathleen M. Higgins. Cambridge: Cambridge University Press.
Anzaldúa, Gloria (1990). "Haciendo cara, una entrada", Making Face, Making Soul/Haciendo Caras: Creative and Critical Perspectives by Feminists of Color, p.xxi. Ed. Gloria Anzaldúa. San Francisco: Aunt Lute Books.
Middleton, Richard (1990/2002). Studying Popular Music. Philadelphia: Open University Press. .
Maróthy (1981).
Stefani (1987).

Sociological terminology